This is a list of artists who have been described as general purveyors of baroque pop, a genre identifiable for its appropriation of Baroque compositional styles (contrapuntal melodies and functional harmony patterns) and dramatic or melancholic gestures. Harpsichords figure prominently, while oboes, French horns, and string quartets are also common. It emerged in the mid 1960s as artists pursued a majestic, orchestral sound.

1960s–70s

1980s–present

References

Bibliography

Baroque pop